Gospodinovo (Bulgarian: Господиново) is a village in eastern Bulgaria. It is located in the municipality of Byala, Varna Province.

As of September 2015 the village has a population of 323.

References
 http://www.guide-bulgaria.com/NE/varna/byala/gospodinovo

Villages in Varna Province